Bromo(tetrahydrothiophene)gold(I) is a coordination complex of gold. It is related to the more commonly used chloro(tetrahydrothiophene)gold(I). Similarly, the tetrahydrothiophene ligand is labile and is readily substituted with other stronger ligands, to give linear gold bromide complexes.

This compound may be prepared by reaction of tetrabromoauric acid (formed from tetrachloroauric acid and hydrobromic acid) with tetrahydrothiophene.

References

Gold(I) compounds
Bromo complexes
Thiolanes
Gold–halogen compounds
Gold–sulfur compounds